The women's 100 metres event at the 1983 Pan American Games was held in Caracas, Venezuela on 23 and 24 August.

Medalists

Results

Heats

Wind:Heat 1: -0.7 m/s

Final
Wind: -2.7 m/s

References

Athletics at the 1983 Pan American Games
1983